The Japanese camel cricket, Diestrammena japanica is a species of camel cricket native to Japan. Outside of its native range, specifically in the eastern United States, it is recognized as an invasive species.

References 

Rhaphidophoridae